Beshirli is a village in the municipality of Hazyrahmedli in the Goranboy District of Azerbaijan.

References

Populated places in Goranboy District